Camille is a 1917 American silent  film based on the play adaptation of La Dame aux Camélias (The Lady of the Camellias) by Alexandre Dumas, fils, first published in French as a novel in 1848 and as a play in 1852. Adapted for the screen by Adrian Johnson, Camille was directed by J. Gordon Edwards and starred Theda Bara as Camille and Albert Roscoe as her lover, Armand.

The film was produced by Fox Film Corporation and shot at the Fox Studio in Fort Lee, New Jersey.

Plot
As described in a film magazine, Armand Duval (Roscoe), a son in the proud but poor house of Duval, loves Camille (Bara), a notorious Parisian beauty. His love for Camille means that his sister Celeste (Whitney) cannot marry the man she loves, so the father goes to Camille and begs her to give Armand up, which she does. This arouses the anger of Armand, and he denounces her one evening in public. The Count de Varville (Law) challenges Armand to a duel, which he wins, wounding Armand in the arm. Believing Camille no longer loves him, Armand does not go to see her. One day, his father tells him that Camille is dying. He goes to her and, after a few words, she dies in the arms of her lover.

Cast
 Theda Bara — Marguerite Gauthier ("Camille")
 Alan Roscoe — Armand Duval (as Albert Roscoe)
 Walter Law — Count de Varville
 Glen White — Gaston Rieux
 Alice Gale — Madame Prudence
 Claire Whitney — Celeste Duval
 Richard Barthelmess — Bit Part

Reception
Like many American films of the time, Camille was subject to cuts by city and state film censorship boards. The Chicago Board of Censors issued an Adult's Only permit, cut two long gambling sequences where money was on the table and flashed all other gambling scenes, and cut the two intertitles "That woman once favored me when I was poor, now that I am rich bear witness that I pay" and "You are here because you are selfish — and make a sale of your love to the highest bidder".

Preservation status
This film is now considered a lost film.

See also
 List of lost films
 1937 Fox vault fire

References

External links

 
 
 
 
 Camille (1917) at SilentEra
 Still photo of a scene from Camille (University of Washington Sayre Collection)

1917 films
1917 drama films
Fox Film films
Silent American drama films
American silent feature films
American black-and-white films
Films based on Camille
American films based on plays
Films directed by J. Gordon Edwards
Films shot in Fort Lee, New Jersey
Lost American films
Films based on adaptations
1917 lost films
Lost drama films
1910s American films
1910s English-language films
English-language drama films